Ərəbocag (also, Ərəbocaq and Arabodzhagy) is a village and municipality in the Agdash Rayon of Azerbaijan.  It has a population of 891.

References 

Populated places in Agdash District